Latozi "Madosini" Mpahleni (25 December 1943 – 23 December 2022) was a South African musician, known for playing Xhosa traditional instruments such as the uhadi and mhrubhe musical bows, and the isitolotolo. 

Madosini performed under the name Madosini and was regarded as a "national treasure" in her field.

Over the years, she had collaborated and written songs with British rock singer Patrick Duff, and in 2003 they went on to perform a number of successful concerts together around the world. She had collaborated with South African musicians Thandiswa Mazwai, Ringo, Derek Gripper and Gilberto Gil the famous Brazilian musician. Her latest collaboration with musicians Hilton Schilder, Jonny Blundell, Lulu Plaitjies and Pedro Espi-Sanchis has resulted in the recording of an African/Jazz fusion CD under the name of AmaThongo and various concerts around Africa.

Madosini and Pedro had performed together at many music festivals as well as story telling and poetry festivals around the world, notably the Medellin International Poetry Festival in Colombia.

From 2006, Madosini performed at many of the WOMAD festivals around the world, and was the first person to be recorded and documented in the festival's Musical Elders Archives project.

Madosini continued to perform around the world until her death. Her music took the audience deep into the well springs of music and represented some of the earliest roots of jazz in Africa. She used the Lydian and Mixolydian modes and also occasional additive time signatures such as 9/8.

Madosini died on 23 December 2022, two days before her 79th birthday.

References

External Links
 
 

1943 births
2022 deaths
South African musicians
Xhosa people
People from Mthatha
Recipients of the Molteno medal